Robert or Bob Paine may refer to:

 Robert Treat Paine (1731–1814), signer of the United States Declaration of Independence
 Robert Treat Paine Jr. (1773–1811), poet and son of the signer
 Robert Treat Paine (North Carolina politician) (1812–1872), U.S. Congressman from North Carolina
 Robert Treat Paine (philanthropist) (1835–1910), Boston lawyer and philanthropist
 Robert Treat Paine Jr. (1866–1961), son of the philanthropist, Democratic candidate for Governor of Massachusetts in 1899 and 1900
 Robert Paine (anthropologist) (1926–2010), English-born Canadian known for his studies of the Sámi people
 Robert T. Paine (zoologist) (1933–2016), American ecologist, who introduced the keystone species concept
 Robert Paine (sculptor) (1870–1946), American artist
 Black Fox (Robert Paine), a fictional superhero in Marvel Comics

See also
 Robert Payne (disambiguation)